The ducheke is a type of fiddle played by the Nanai people of the Amur River Basin.

See also 
T'yngryng, a Nivkh instrument of Sakhalin
Huchir, a spike-fiddle of the Buryat Mongols

References 

Russian musical instruments
Bowed instruments
Tungusic culture